WTGZ (95.9 FM, "The Tiger") is a commercial radio station in Tuskegee, Alabama, broadcasting to the Auburn, Alabama, area. Until 2007 the station also broadcast to the Montgomery, Alabama, area on 104.9 FM.  The Tiger is the area's only modern rock station and is popular with Auburn University students.

On May 4, 2020, WTGZ and its alternative rock format moved to 95.9 FM Tuskegee, swapping frequencies with talk-formatted WQSI.

Programming
WTGZ airs an alternative rock music format branded as "The Tiger." Notable former on-air personalities include Marti Jackson, Ripper Price, Matt Stone, Sharpie, Johnny Wilkes, and Bill Bailey.

Alternative rock from the 1990s and the 2000s is the dominant style of music on the Tiger. Hard Drive airs active rock and heavy metal. These genres of music compose a small portion of the station's regular playlist as well.

WTGZ simulcasts Auburn High School Tigers football games on FM along with WAUD.

References

External links
The Tiger 95.9 Twitter
WTGZ official website

TGZ
Modern rock radio stations in the United States
Radio stations established in 1975
1975 establishments in Alabama